The third and final season of Baldwin Hills premiered on January 27, 2009 and concluded on March 17, 2009.

Cast
The following is a list of the cast members for the 3rd season.

  Main Cast Member
  Secondary Cast Member

Episodes

References

2009 American television seasons